Tom Costelloe may refer to:
 Tom Costelloe (Tralee Mitchels Gaelic footballer) (1887–1934), Irish Gaelic footballer with the Kerry senior football team
 Tom Costelloe (Duagh Gaelic footballer) (born 1931), Irish Gaelic footballer with the Kerry senior football team

See also
 Tom Costello (disambiguation)